Teen Tech Week is an annual national event held on the second week in March by YALSA in conjunction with ALA. Teen Tech Week promotes digital resources within libraries across the country that are available for teens and their families. Overall, the general theme of Teen Tech Week is "Get Connected". The focus of Teen Tech Week is encouraging teens to come out and visit their local library and learn about all of the different technical and digital tools that are available to them.

Past Themes

2014

This year's theme was DIY@your library. "Libraries bridge the gap between in-school and out-of-school time, helping teens learn through digital media so they can achieve more academically and develop the digital and media literacy skills they will need in order to be informed, productive citizens."

2015

The 2015 theme was "Libraries Are for the Making."

Why Have Teen Tech Week

While there are millions of teens who do not have access to a home computer most still have access to a library. Libraries give teens the opportunity to gain important digital literacy skills.  "Libraries offer a bridge across the digital divide. Libraries also recognize that digital media plays an important part in a teens’ life.  That is why more libraries than ever are helping teens build critical digital literacy skills, which they will use to obtain scholarships, secure jobs, effectively manage their online identity and more.

How Can You Participate

The first thing that you should do is sign up on YALSA's website to let it know that you are participating. The reason for this is because YALSA is a nonprofit organization that depends on the support of its members. When you register on the website you are letting them know that "your library supports encouraging teens to be safe, responsible users of the many technologies available to them. By registering, you are telling YALSA that this program is worthwhile, and we will continue to sponsor the week."

Once registered how you participate?

There are numerous ways in which you and your library can participate in Teen Tech Week.  You can incorporate special programs or activities into your library program for that week or you can even simply push your digital media items and encourage the teens and parents who come into the library and check them out and help them learn about what is available to them.

Can non-librarians participate?

YES! "Teen Tech Week is a national initiative aimed at teens, their parents, librarians, educators, booksellers and other concerned adults. If you would like to participate, just register!" 

Are you a teen? Then here is what you can do!

"The best thing to do is to talk to your public or school librarian. Ask them if they have anything planned for Teen Tech Week and let them know you are interested in helping out. If your teacher or librarian does not have anything planned or has never heard of Teen Tech Week, show them this web site and help them get started!" 

What does it cost to participate in Teen Tech Week ?

There is no cost for participating in Teen Tech Week. Promotional materials are made available to be purchased but they are not required to participate.

If you have any additional questions about Teen Tech Week you might want to check out their Frequently Asked Questions Page.

YALSA

YALSA has created their own Wiki page about Teen Tech Week.

For more information on YALSA you can check out their Wiki page here.

ALA is the parent organization of YALSA and for more information on them you can find it here at their Wikipedia page.

References 

American Library Association
Public libraries